Ignacio Flores Ocaranza (31 July 1953 – 11 August 2011) was a Mexican professional footballer who played as a right-back.

Club career
Born in Mexico City, Flores spent his entire professional career with Cruz Azul.

He also represented Mexico at international level, and participated at the 1978 FIFA World Cup.

Personal life
Flores was killed when a truck carrying his family was attacked by gunmen in August 2011.

His brother, Luis Flores, also was a Mexico international footballer.

References

1953 births
2011 deaths
Footballers from Mexico City
Association football fullbacks
Mexican footballers
Mexico international footballers
1978 FIFA World Cup players
Cruz Azul footballers
Liga MX players
Male murder victims
People murdered in Mexico
Mexican murder victims
Deaths by firearm in Mexico